This is a list of Norwegian football transfers in the 2020–2021 winter transfer window by club. Only clubs of the 2021 Eliteserien and 2021 1. divisjon are included.

Because of the covid-related postponement of the league kickoff, the winter transfer window which was supposed to have lasted from 15 January to 7 April, was split in two: 15 January to 24 March and 29 April to 12 May.

Eliteserien

Bodø/Glimt

In:

Out:

Brann

In:

Out:

Haugesund

In:

Out:

Kristiansund

In:

Out:

Lillestrøm

In:

Out:

Mjøndalen

In:

Out:

Molde

In:

Out:

Odd

In:

Out:

Rosenborg

In:

Out:

Sandefjord

In:

Out:

Sarpsborg 08

In:

Out:

Stabæk

In:

Out:

Strømsgodset

In:

Out:

Tromsø

In:

Out:

Viking

In:

Out:

Vålerenga

In:

Out:

1. divisjon

Aalesund

In:

Out:

Bryne

In:

Out:

Fredrikstad

In:

Out:

Grorud

In:

Out:

HamKam

In:

Out:

Jerv

In:

Out:

KFUM

In:

Out:

Ranheim

In:

Out:

Raufoss

In:

Out:

Sandnes Ulf

In:

Out:

Sogndal

In:

Out:

Start

In:

Out:

Stjørdals-Blink

In:

Out:

Strømmen

In:

Out:

Ull/Kisa

In:

Out:

Åsane

In:

Out:

References

Norway
Transfers
Transfers
2020-21